Z2 may refer to:

 Z2 (computer), a computer created by Konrad Zuse
 , the quotient ring of the ring of integers modulo the ideal of even numbers, alternatively denoted by 
 Z2, the cyclic group of order 2
GF(2), the Galois field of 2 elements, alternatively written as Z2
 Z2, the standard axiomatization of second-order arithmetic
 Z² (album), an album by Devin Townsend
 German destroyer Z2 Georg Thiele, a Type 1934 destroyer in the German Kriegsmarine
 USS Ringgold (DD-500), a destroyer transferred to the German Navy as Z-2 in 1959
 Westinghouse Airships Z-2 blimp prototype for the U.S. Navy   
 Kawasaki Z2, a motorcycle
 RAID-Z2, a way to combine multiple disk drives in a computer
 Zelda II: The Adventure of Link, the second video game in the Legend of Zelda series
 Zork II, a computer game
 A wireless speaker system from Bowers & Wilkins
 Philippines AirAsia, an airline based in Pasay, Philippines
 The Sony Xperia Z2, an Android smartphone
 The movie Zoolander 2